The 2019–20 Egyptian Second Division was the 40th edition of the Egyptian Second Division, the top Egyptian semi-professional level for football clubs, since its establishment in 1977. The season started on 20 October 2019 and was originally scheduled to conclude on 21 April 2020, but was later changed to 15 October 2020 due to the COVID-19 pandemic in Egypt. Fixtures for the 2019–20 season were announced on 18 September 2019.

National Bank of Egypt, Ceramica Cleopatra and Ghazl El Mahalla won Group A, Group B and Group C respectively and secured the promotion to the 2020–21 Egyptian Premier League; with the first two earning a place in the top flight for the first time in their history.

On 14 March 2020, a decision was made by the Egyptian Football Association to postpone all football activities in Egypt due to the spread of the COVID-19 pandemic in the country. The initial suspension, until 29 March, was then extended multiple times until at least mid-July. On 2 July 2020, the EFA announced that football competitions in Egypt would resume, with the Premier League recommencing on 6 August, Second Division on 21 September and Egypt Cup on 30 September. The EFA also confirmed that all clubs' players and staff would be tested for COVID-19 before resuming training.

Teams

Team changes
The following teams have changed division since the 2018–19 season.

To Second Division
Promoted from Third Division

 Asyut Petroleum
 Muslim Youths (Qena)
 Maleyat Kafr El Zayat
 National Bank of Egypt
 Biyala
 Dikernis

Relegated from Premier League

 Petrojet
 El Dakhleya
 Nogoom

From Second Division
Relegated to Third Division

 Al Nasr Lel Taa'den
 El Tahrir
 MS Naser Malawy
 Al Walideya
 El Shams
 Porto Suez
 Damietta
 Abou Sakal
 Kafr El Sheikh
 Al Jazeera
 MS Tala
 Sidi Salem

Promoted to Premier League

 Aswan
 FC Masr
 Tanta

Stadiums and locations
Note: Table lists in alphabetical order.

Group A

2 teams from Asyut, 2 teams from Beni Suef, 2 teams from Sohag, 2 teams from Qena, 1 team from Cairo, 1 team from Faiyum, 1 team from Giza, and 1 team from El Minya.

Group B

3 teams from Cairo, 3 teams from Giza, 2 teams from Suez, 1 team from Damietta, 1 team from Ismailia, 1 team from El Monufia and 1 team from Port Said.

Group C

3 teams from Alexandria, 3 teams from El Gharbia, 2 teams from El Dakahlia, 2 teams from Matruh, 1 team from El Beheira and 1 team from Kafr El Sheikh.

Notes

Results

League tables

Group A

Group B

Group C

Positions by round
The tables lists the positions of teams after each week of matches. In order to preserve chronological evolvements, any postponed matches are not included in the round at which they were originally scheduled, but added to the full round they were played immediately afterwards. For example, if a match is scheduled for matchday 13, but then postponed and played between days 16 and 17, it will be added to the standings for day 16.

Group A

Group B

Group C

Results tables

Group A

Group B

Group C

Number of teams by governorate

References

Egyptian Second Division seasons
Egypt
Egyptian Second Division
Association football events postponed due to the COVID-19 pandemic